Gwiazda Lake is a ribbon lake situated in Pomeranian Voivodeship in Bytów County; in Bytów Lakeland. Chocina River starts its flow from this lake. It covers an area of 210.4 ha being 5.7 km long and 0.2-0.7 km wide. The average depth is 3 m and the maximum is 10 m.

See also
 Borowy Młyn (Bytów County)

Lakes of Poland
Lakes of Pomeranian Voivodeship